Denham Hitchcock  is an Australian journalist and broadcaster. He is the current senior reporter for Channel Seven’s documentary unit, Spotlight.

Career 
Hitchcock started his media career as a junior researcher at Channel 7’s program, Today Tonight, in 1994. soon after, he progressed at Channel 7, where he worked as a researcher and producer on Today Tonight and then The Times. Hitchcock went on to become a producer and part-time news reporter for the Early Morning News, 6pm news, and later an executive Producer for the 11am news program.

In 2010, Hitchcock was awarded the coveted position of U.S. Correspondent for the Nine Network. 

In 2011, he provided 24-hour coverage on the death of Osama bin Laden. He covered the Typhoon Haiyan for the channel by hiring a private plane to fly into the devastated area. He was sent to Vatican City for the 2013 papal conclave, and was reporting live on the streets in New York during the Hurricane Sandy in 2012. Hitchcock has covered a series of mass shootings in the United States including the Sandy Hook Elementary School shooting where 25 people were killed.

In 2014 Hitchcock left the Nine Network and returned to Australia to work for Channel Seven’s program, Sunday Night.

In 2017, he went to Mexico to confront a plastic surgeon, whose negligence led to the death of several patients including an Australian woman. The same year, he flew to Colombia to report on the controversial arrest and imprisonment of an Australian woman by the name of Cassandra Sainsbury, accused of being a cocaine drug mule.

Hitchcock has traveled to Iraq and Syria twice to report on the rise and fall of the ISIL.

In 2020, the Sunday Night program was discontinued by the Seven Network Hitchcock was retained to create hour long documentaries to fill the current affairs void left behind. The first report was on the 2019–20 Australian bushfire season.Hitchcock has written many articles for major Australian newspapers such as The Sydney Morning Herald and The Daily Telegraph. He has also compiled several reports for the world's largest men's magazine, Men's Health, including a visit to a traditional kickboxing camp in Thailand, and later completing a five-day fast.

In 2021, shortly after receiving the Pfizer–BioNTech COVID-19 vaccine, he was hospitalized for pericarditis, a side effect linked to the spike protein injection.

References 

Australian journalists
Living people
Australian war correspondents
Australian television presenters
Australian newspaper editors
Australian newspaper proprietors
Year of birth missing (living people)